Bunner Glacier is a glacier in the northeast part of Bear Peninsula, flowing to the sea along the southeast side of Gurnon Peninsula, in Marie Byrd Land. It was mapped by the United States Geological Survey from surveys and from U.S. Navy air photos, 1959–66, and named by the Advisory Committee on Antarctic Names for Sergeant Donald R. Bunner, a member of the U.S. Army Aviation Detachment in Antarctica during U.S. Navy Operation Deepfreeze 1965 and 1966.

References
 

Glaciers of Marie Byrd Land